The 2010–11 season was Sydney FC's sixth consecutive season in the A-League since the competition's inception. The club competed in the 2011 AFC Champions League after finishing premiers and champions in the 2009–10 A-League. In the preseason, Sydney hosted the inaugural Sydney Festival of Football, which saw competition between three clubs from different European leagues and Sydney FC.

2010–11 squad
Players included in a Sydney FC squad in the 2010–11 season

Transfers

Pre-season
Out

In

January Transfer Window & Asian Champions League Signings
Out

In

Players re-signed (pre-season)

Players re-signed (mid-season)

Pre-season & mid-season triallists
  Joey Gibbs (unsuccessful)
  Glen Trifiro (unsuccessful)
  Terry Antonis (successful)
  Nathan Sherlock (unsuccessful)
  Dimitri Petratos (unsuccessful)
  Tommy Crjack (unsuccessful)
  Luciano Olguin (unsuccessful)
  Hirofumi Moriyasu (successful)
  Ibrahima Iyane Thiam (unsuccessful)
  Bruno Cazarine (successful)
  Gilles Mbang Ondo (unsuccessful)
  Juho Mäkelä (successful)

Events

March
 25th: Liam Reddy signs a 3-year deal to Sydney FC from Wellington Phoenix as replacement for Clint Bolton.

April

May
 21st: Scott Jamieson signs a 2-year contract to Sydney FC from Adelaide United.
 26th: Nick Carle signs a 3-year contract to Sydney FC from Crystal Palace FC.

June
 15th: Sydney FC play their first pre-season friendly against Manly United and win 2–1.
 22nd: Sydney FC play their second pre-season friendly against Macarthur Rams and win 1–0.
 30th: Sydney FC play their third pre-season friendly against Marconi Stallions and win 3–1.

July

 5th: Terry Antonis signs a 3-year contract to Sydney FC from the AIS. He was officially signed on a 3-year contract to Sydney FC on 5 July 2010.
 10th: Sydney FC play a pre-season friendly against Everton FC at ANZ Stadium and lose 1–0.
 17th: Sydney FC play a pre-season friendly against Central Coast Mariners at Sydney Showground and play out a 2–2 draw.
 21st: Hirofumi Moriyasu signs a 1-year contract to Sydney FC.
 22nd: Alex Brosque extends his contract with Sydney FC for a further 3-years.
 25th: Sydney Festival of Football Sydney FC lose 5–3 to Greek Super League club AEK Athens on Match day 1.
 28th: Sydney Festival of Football: Sydney FC draw 0–0 against Scottish Premier League club Rangers F.C. in torrential rain.
 31st: Sydney Festival of Football: Sydney FC lose 2–1 to English Premier League club Blackburn Rovers

August
 7th: Round 1. 3–3 draw with Melbourne Victory at Sydney Football Stadium.
 14th: Round 2. 2–1 loss with North Queensland Fury at Dairy Farmers Stadium, Townsville.
 21st: Round 3. 1–0 loss with Brisbane Roar at Suncorp Stadium, Brisbane
21st: Terry McFlynn plays his 100th game for Sydney FC in the A-League.
 28th: Round 4. 1–1 draw with Central Coast Mariners at the SFS.  Liam Reddy red carded after fouling Patricio Pérez.
 31st: Bruno Cazarine Constantino signs with Sydney FC

September
 4th Round 5: 3–1 loss to Adelaide United at the Sydney Football Stadium. The result leaves Sydney winless and with only 2 points from 5 rounds.
 11th Round 6: 2–1 loss to Wellington Phoenix at Westpac Stadium in Wellington.
 26 Round 8: 1–1 draw with Gold Coast United at Sydney Football Stadium. Bruno Cazarine scoring for Sydney FC in the first half.
 29th: Round 9: 1–1 draw with North Queensland Fury in front of Sydney FC's lowest record crowd, on a cold, wet Wednesday night.

October
 4th: Sydney FC lose their 5th game of the season, going down 2–1 to Adelaide United at the Sydney Football Stadium. The loss keeps them at the bottom of the ladder, without a win after 9 rounds.
 16th: 3–0 loss to The City Derby rivals Melbourne Victory at Etihad Stadium in Melbourne. The loss keeps them at the bottom of the ladder on 4 points.
 24th: Sydney FC finally win their first game of the season, in the 11th Round, with a crushing 3–0 victory over mid-table stragglers Perth Glory at nib stadium in Perth. Brazilian import Bruno Cazarine scoring twice on either side of half time, and Alex Brosque giving the Sky Blues some mid-season hope.
30th: A 1–1 draw against 2nd on the table Brisbane Roar gives Sydney a 2-game unbeaten streak.

November
 3rd: Vitezslav Lavicka, in an attempt to boost their dwindling striker stocks, brings in Gabon striker Gilles Mbang Ondo on trial from Iceland Club Knattspyrnudeild UMFG.
 4th: After several pleasing performances with the club, Lavicka offers Japanese import Hirofumi Moriyasu a 2-year extension with the club, which he gratefully accepted.
 7th: Sydney win their second match of the season, albeit it being under controversial circumstances due to a refereeing blunder, a 1–0 victory over North Coast rivals Newcastle Jets at the Sydney Football Stadium. Bruno Cazarine scored the eventual winner in the 76th minute
 12th: Sydney FC re-sign goalkeeper Ivan Necevski on a 2-year contract after he had signed a 1-year extension at the conclusion of the 2009–10 season.
12th: Sydney FC end their 3-game unbeaten streak, losing 3–1 to Gold Coast United at Skilled Park. Bruno Cazarine scored his 6th goal in 10 games for the Sky Blues, moving to the top of the goalscoring charts alongside Adelaide Uniteds Dutchman Sergio van Dijk.
 21st: Sydney FC defeat Perth Glory 2–0 in at Parramatta Stadium in front of their lowest ever record crowd of 6,654. Goals coming from Alex Brosque and Shannon Cole.
 21st: Striker Alex Brosque plays his 100th A-League game for Sydney FC, also scoring to help Sydney defeat Perth 2–0.
 27th: Sydney play out a 0–0 draw against new A-League team Melbourne Heart at the new AAMI Park. Sydney faced up against former Championship players Clint Bolton, Simon Colosimo, and John Aloisi for the first time since the trio left the club following the 2010 A-League Grand Final.

December
 1st Sydney FC have defeated Wellington Phoenix at Sydney Football Stadium with Mark Bridge finally scored his first goal for the season and convincing 3–1 win in front of the lowest crowd attendance 4012.
 4th Sydney FC have suffered their worst defeat against the Central Coast Mariners at Bluetongue Stadium with 4–0 thumping at the hands of Central Coast Mariners.
 11th Sydney FC have boosted their striker positions with the signing of Finnish striker Juho Mäkelä. He is expected to play for the Sky Blues early January next year. He signed an 18-month deal.
 12th Unfortunately, Sydney FC have gone down again, losing 1–0 to league leaders Brisbane Roar in front of crowd at Sydney Football Stadium.
 16th Sydney FC have slumped to their third loss, going down to wooden spooners North Queensland Fury 1–0 at Dairy Farmers Stadium. Despite this loss, Sydney FC's position is falling from 9th to 10th.
 23rd Sydney FC have slumped to their fourth straight loss, going down to newcomers Melbourne Heart 1–0 at Sydney Football Stadium, thanks to late goal by Adrian Zahra. Three former players: Simon Colosimo, John Aloisi and Clint Bolton were solid in defence, attack and goalkeeping.
 29th Again, Sydney FC have slumped to their fifth straight loss, going down to 2nd placed Adelaide United at Adelaide Oval, 2–0.

January 2011
 3rd Sydney FC have snapped their five match losing streak beating Newcastle Jets at Energy Australia Stadium in front of the highest crowd of the home stadium, 12,118, thanks to first goal scored in Sydney's colours by Hirofumi Moriyasu and Bruno Cazarine's seventh goal of the season. The win lifts the Sky Blues off the bottom of the table.
 8th Defending champions Sydney FC have made back-to-back wins for the first time this season. They also have broken their drought, beating 10-man Gold Coast United for the first time, beating them 2–0 at Sydney Football Stadium in front of 6,135. Young player Dimitri Petratos and new Finnish recruit Juho Makela scored their first goal in Sky Blue colours, thanks to fantastic display by midfielders Nick Carle and Hirofumi Moriyasu. The win lifts them to 9th place however, they must win the remaining games to make the top 6.
 15th At Sydney Football Stadium just under the best crowd attendance of 12,106 back in Round 1 (officially 11,388), Sydney FC have all kept their finals dream alive but with a late equaliser by Juho Makela in 1–1 draw against their biggest rivals Melbourne Victory who lost their key players: Kevin Muscat, Robbie Kruse, Archie Thompson, could lift the Sky Blues a boost to the finals. However, it is not bad for them, the unbeaten streak stretched to 3 games. The Sky Blues will be travelling to Gosford next week against Central Coast Mariners at Bluetongue Stadium which they will avenge during their 4–0 loss few weeks ago if they want to make the finals.
 18th It is known that Sydney FC coach Vitezslav Lavicka will lead the Sky Blues in 2011 Asian Champions League. The board meeting decided that they will not sack him.
 23rd Sydney FC once again, has maintained their unbeaten streak to 4 games, but their dream in the finals has been dealt a blow with a 2–2 draw against Central Coast Mariners at Bluetongue Stadium. It starts off ok with the defending champions lead 2–0 at half-time but Central Coast Mariners pulled off a comeback with goals to Patricio Perez and Matthew Simon. The Sky Blues' next opponent will be Perth Glory at Members Equity Stadium, which they will win the next game, since defeating them two times this season.
 30th Once again, Sydney FC have stretched their unbeaten games to 5 and kept their finals hopes alive with a solid 2–0 win over Perth Glory at Members Equity Stadium. The win lifts them 4 points adrift Melbourne Heart. Thanks to the finally goal scored by Nicky Carle after injury concern and the second goal scored by Bruno Cazarine who scored his 8th goal of the season. Sky Blues' next opponent will be the archrivals Newcastle Jets at EnergyAustralia Stadium.
 31st Sydney FC sold a key striker Alex Brosque to Shimizu S-Pulse in J-League. However, the Sky Blues claim that the Japanese side approached him without their permission to do so.

February 2011
6th Sydney FC's finals are all but over with a thrilling 1–1 draw against Newcastle Jets at EnergyAustralia Stadium. Sky Blues almost had a chance to break the 1–1 draw to make it 2–1 win but time has run out. They are out of the finals for second time. The 1st time they didn't make the finals is in season 2008–09. They are now focusing on the upcoming 2011 Asian Champions League in March. Sydney FC's next game is against Wellington Phoenix at Sydney Football Stadium, their last home game of the season.
17th Sydney FC sign North Queensland Fury striker David Williams on a 6-month loan for the Asian Champions League.
25th Sydney FC sign Wellington Phoenix player Andrew Durante on a loan deal for the Asian Champions League.
26th Sydney FC board re-sign manager Vitezslav Lavicka on a 12-month extension, allowing him to coach Sydney through the Asian Champions League, and into the 2011–12 season.

March 2011
 2nd: Sydney FC play their first Asian Champions League match against Suwon Samsung Bluewings and draw 0–0. Captain Terry McFlynn is sent off in the 32nd minute for stomping on the leg of Lee Sang-ho.

April 2011
 6th: Sydney draw 1–1 with Chinese Super League and Sister Club, Shanghai Shenhua at the Sydney Football Stadium. Nick Carle scoring for Sydney in the 12th minute, leveling the scores at 1–1 after Shanghai's Duvier Riascos opened the scoring in the 6th minute.
 13th: Sydney FC lose 3–0 to Kashima Antlers at the Sydney Football Stadium. Kashima scoring via Fellype Gabriel, Takuya Nozawa, and Shinzo Koroki.
 19th: Sydney FC win their first 2011 Champions League game in a hard-fought match against Shanghai Shenhua at Hongkou Stadium in Shanghai. Sydney won 3–2 with a double from Bruno Cazarine and a late extra-time goal from Mark Bridge sealing the victory.

May 2011
 3rd: Sydney FC lose 3–1 to Suwon Samsung Bluewings in the return leg. Bruno Cazarine scoring his third goal in the Champions League. Sydney had to win this game, to provide any chance of progressing through the round of 16.
 10th: Sydney FC lose their final ACL group game in Tokyo, Japan against J-League club Kashima Antlers. Sydney FC took the lead midway through the first half via a Matthew Jurman header, but failed to hold on, conceding two soft second half goals as the Japanese side ran out 2–1 winners.

Pre-season

2010 Sydney Festival of Football

2010–11 A-League season

Asian Champions League Campaign

Sydney FC have been drawn into Group H of the 2011 AFC Champions League. They will face off against Japan's Kashima Antlers, People's Republic of China Shanghai Shenhua and South Korea's Suwon Samsung Bluewings.

Group ladder

A-League Season Statistics

Leading scorers
Sydney FC A-League Top Scorers
 Correct as of Round 24

Discipline

 Correct as of Round 10

 Liam Reddy was sent off in the Round 4 game against Central Coast Mariners after referee Matthew Breeze deemed he had tripped Patricio Pérez in the box. However, this red card was rebuked by the Match Review Panel, which deemed Perez to have dived in the box, and as a result handed Perez a 2-week ban.

Home Attendance

 Correct as of Round 30

Injury List
Correct as of Round 10

See also
 Sydney FC
 Sydney FC season 2009-10
 A-League 2010-11

References

Sydney FC seasons
2010–11 A-League season by team